Denaby Halt was a small railway station on the Dearne Valley Railway (DVR), intended to serve the mining community of Denaby Main in South Yorkshire, England, although it was some distance from there, in what was described as "a marshy wilderness". The station was opened on 3 June 1912. Its full title, as shown on its nameboard, was Denaby for Conisboro' and Mexboro. The halt was located between Edlington Halt, the eastern passenger terminus of the line and Harlington Halt.

The DVR was operated by the Lancashire & Yorkshire Railway and was built in order to tap the coal traffic available in the area, which could be shipped through their port at Goole.

The line offered a passenger service between Wakefield and Edlington, near Doncaster.

The halt was closed on 1 January 1949.

References

External links
 The railway line on navigable 1955 O. S. map
 The station on navigable 1935 O. S. map

Disused railway stations in Doncaster
Former Dearne Valley Railway stations
Railway stations in Great Britain opened in 1912
Railway stations in Great Britain closed in 1949
1912 establishments in England